Mohammad Hosayn Âyrom was a senior military leader of the Pahlavi dynasty of Iran during the reign of king Reza Shah (r. 1925–41). He was the nephew of General Teymur Xân Âyromlu and a first cousin of Queen Tâj ol-Moluk Âyromlu. Only some members of the Ayrums family spelled their surname "Âyromlu" with the added suffix "-lu".

Biography
Born in 1882 in Baku (then part of the Russian Empire) as a member of the Turkic Ayrom tribe, Ayrom soon joined the ranks of the Persian Cossack Brigade and became an associate to Reza Khan (later Reza Shah). Ayrom climbed up the ranks swiftly, becoming a colonel of Iran's Cossack Brigade as early as 1901. Prior to the Russian Revolution, Ayrom reportedly spent some years in the Imperial Russian ranks, serving as an officer in the Tsarist army. He returned to Iran in 1921.

He became Chief of Iran's National Police (Shahrbāni) in 1931. At the height of his career, he was viewed as more powerful than a Cabinet member and Reza Shah's right-hand man. His abuses of his position included graft, framing innocent people and smuggling and seeing what was happening to others he pretended to be ill and left Iran permanently.

During World War II, Ayrom made active efforts in order to create a government in exile in Berlin, German-backed, under the name of Īrān-e āzād. The aims were to perform activity against the allied occupation of Iran, and to take over Iran as well after the German victory in the war. During the Allied occupation of Iran, when it led to the arrests of all sympathizers with Germany, Ayrom was "arrested and confined to a village in Germany".

He died on 31 March 1948 in Liechtenstein (where he had become a citizen) while staying there for medical treatment.

See also
Tadj ol-Molouk Ayromlou
General Teymūr Khan Ayromlou
Reza Shah Pahlavi
Colonel Pessian
Ali Soheili
Amir Abdollah Tahmasebi
Sar Lashgar Buzarjomehri
Mahmud Khan Puladeen
Amanullah Jahanbani

References

Sources
 

Imperial Iranian Army major generals
Iranian Azerbaijanis
1882 births
1948 deaths
Military personnel from Baku
Emigrants from the Russian Empire to Iran
Iranian emigrants to Liechtenstein
Military personnel of the Russian Empire